Canada competed at the 2000 Summer Olympics in Sydney, Australia, held from 15 September to 1 October 2000. 294 competitors, 150 men, and 144 women, took part in 175 events in 29 sports.

The final days of the Olympics for Canada were somewhat overshadowed by the death of Pierre Trudeau, the country's 15th prime minister. When the closing ceremonies took place, he was lying in state, allowing Canadians to travel to Ottawa to pay their respects.

Medalists

|align="left" valign="top"|

| width="22%" align="left" valign="top" |

Archery

Canada's archery squad in Sydney consisted of only one man, veteran Rob Rusnov. He lost his first match.

Athletics

Men
Track & road events

Field events

Women
Track & road events

Field events

Badminton

Men's Singles
Mike Beres
 Round of 64: bye
 Round of 32: lost to Kevin Han of United States

Men's Doubles
Bryan Moody, Brent Olynyk
 Round of 32: defeated Zhang Jun, Zhang Wei of China
 Round of 16: lost to Jesper Larsen, Jens Eriksen of Denmark

Women's Singles
Kara Solmundson
 Round of 64: lost to Lidya Djaelawijaya of Indonesia
Robbyn Hermitage
 Round of 64: lost to Rayoni Head of Australia
Milaine Cloutier
 Round of 64: bye
 Round of 32: lost to Kim Ji-hyun of Korea

Women's Doubles
Milaine Cloutier, Robbyn Hermitage
 Round of 32: defeated Rhonda Cator, Amanda Hardy of Australia
 Round of 16: lost to Joanne Goode, Donna Kellogg of Great Britain

Mixed Doubles
Milaine Cloutier, Bryan Moody
 Round of 32: lost to Nicol Pitro, Michael Keck of Germany
Robbyn Hermitage, Brent Olynyk
 Round of 32: lost to Joanne Goode, Simon Archer of Great Britain
Kara Solmundson, Mike Beres
 Round of 32: defeated Marie-Helene Valerie Pierre, Stephan Beeharry of Mauritius
 Round of 16: lost to Michael Sogaard, Rikke Olsen of Denmark

Basketball

Men's Team Competition
Preliminary round
Defeated Australia (101-90)
Defeated Angola (99-54)
Defeated Spain (91-77)
Lost to Russia (59-77)
Defeated Yugoslavia (83-75)
Quarterfinals
Lost to France (63-68)
Classification match
7th/8th place – defeated Russia (86-83) → 7th place
Team roster
Rowan Barrett
David Daniels
Greg Francis
Pete Guarasci
Sherman Hamilton
Eric Hinrichsen
Todd MacCulloch
Andrew Mavis
Michael Meeks
Steve Nash
Greg Newton
Shawn Swords

Women's Team Competition
Preliminary round
Lost to Australia (46-78)
Defeated Senegal (41-62)
Lost to France (58-70)
Lost to Slovakia (56-68)
Defeated Brazil (61-60)
Classification match
9th/10th place – lost to Cuba (58-67) → 10th place
Team roster
Cori-Lyn Blakebrough
Carolin Bouchard
Kelly Boucher
Claudia Brassard-Riebesehl
Stacey Dales-Schuman
Michelle Hendry
Nikki Johnson
Karla Karch
Teresa Kleindienst
Joy McNichol
Dianne Norman
Tammy Sutton-Brown

Beach volleyball

John Child and Mark Heese – 5th place (tied)
Jody Holden and Conrad Leinemann – 9th place (tied)

Boxing

Men's Flyweight (51 kg)
Andrew Kooner
Round 1 – defeated Nacer Keddam of Algeria
Round 2 – lost to Wijan Ponlid of Thailand (→ did not advance)

Men's Light Welterweight (63.5 kg)
Michael Strange
Round 1 – lost to Nurhan Suleymanoglu of Turkey (→ did not advance)

Men's Light Middleweight (71 kg)
Scott MacIntosh
Round 1 – defeated Sakio Bika Mbah of CMR
Round 2 – lost to Jermain Taylor of United States (→ did not advance)

Men's Middleweight (75 kg)
Donald Grant Orr
Round 1 – lost to Jitender Kumar of India (→ did not advance)

Men's Light Heavyweight (81 kg)
Troy Amos-Ross
Round 1 – bye
Round 2 – lost to Jegbefumere Albert of Nigeria (→ did not advance)

Men's Heavyweight (91 kg)
Mark Simmons
Round 1 – bye
Round 2 – defeated Rouhollah Hosseini of Iran
Quarterfinal – lost to Sebastian Kober of Germany (→ did not advance)

Men's Super Heavyweight (+ 91 kg)
Art Binkowski
Round 1 – bye
Round 2 – defeated Michael Macaque of Mauritius
Quarterfinal – lost to Rustam Saidov of Uzbekistan (→ did not advance)

Canoeing

Flatwater

Men's Competition
Men's Kayak Singles 500 m
Mihai Apostol
 Qualifying Heat – 01:42.562 (→ did not advance)

Men's Kayak Singles 1000 m
Mihai Apostol
 Qualifying Heat – 03:47.679 (→ did not advance)

Men's Canoe Singles 500 m
Maxime Boilard
 Qualifying Heat – 01:52.764
 Semifinal – 01:52.071
 Final – 02:29.259 (→ 4th place)

Men's Canoe Singles 1000 m
Steve Giles
 Qualifying Heat – 03:55.396
 Semifinal – bye
 Final – 03:56.437 (→  Bronze medal)

Men's Canoe Doubles 500 m
Tamás Buday, Attila Buday
 Qualifying Heat – 01:46.557 (→ did not advance)

Men's Canoe Doubles 1,000 m
Tamás Buday, Attila Buday
 Qualifying Heat – 03:41.075
 Semifinal – 03:44.358
 Final – 03:48.017 (→ 7th place)

Women's Competition
Women's Kayak Singles 500 m
Caroline Brunet
 Qualifying Heat – 01:51.558
 Semifinal – bye
 Final – 02:14.646 (→  Silver medal)

Women's Kayak Doubles 500 m
Caroline Brunet, Karen Furneaux
 Qualifying Heat – 01:44.476
 Semifinal – bye
 Final – 02:01.046 (→ 5th place)

Women's Kayak Fours 500 m
Maria-Josee Gibeau-Ouimet, Kamina Jain, Carrie Lightbound, Julia Rivard
 Qualifying Heat – 01:38.209
 Semifinal – 01:38.340
 Final – 01:39.566 (→ 9th place)

Slalom

Men's Competition
Men's Kayak Singles
David Ford
 Qualifying – 323.58 (→ did not advance)

Men's Canoe Singles
James Cartwright-Garland
 Qualifying – 297.66 (→ did not advance)

Men's Canoe Doubles
Benoît Gauthier, Tyler Lawlor
 Qualifying – 311.11 (→ did not advance)

Women's Competition
Women's Kayak Singles
Margaret Langford
 Qualifying – 314.51
 Final – 274.14 (→ 13th place)

Cycling

Cross Country Mountain Bike
Men's Cross Country Mountain Bike
Geoff Kabush
 Final – 2:14:00.66 (→ 9th place)
Roland Green
 Final – 2:15:18.85 (→ 14th place)

Women's Mountain Bike
Alison Sydor
 Final – 1:52:19.32 (→ 5th place)
Chrissy Redden
 Final – 1:54:07.38 (→ 8th place)
Lesley Tomlinson
 Final – 2:00:44.08 (→ 19th place)

Road Cycling

Men's Competition
Men's Individual Time Trial
Eric Wohlberg
 Final – 1:00:34 (→ 20th place)

Men's Road Race
Gordon Fraser
 Final – 5:30:46 (→ 16th place)
Eric Wohlberg
 Final – 5:30:46 (→ 72nd place)
Czeslaw Lukaszewicz
 Final – DNF
Brian Walton
 Final – DNF

Women's Competition
Women's Individual Time Trial
Clara Hughes
 Final – 0:43:12 (→ 6th place)
Genevieve Jeanson
 Final – 0:44:32 (→ 15th place)

Women's Road Race
Genevieve Jeanson
 Final – 3:06:31 (→ 11th place)
Lyne Bessette
 Final – 3:06:31 (→ 22nd place)
Clara Hughes
 Final – 3:16:49 (→ 43rd place)

Track Cycling

Men's competition
Men's 1 km Time Trial
Jim Fisher
Final – 01:05.835 (→ 12th place)

Men's Point Race
Brian Walton
Points – 1
Laps Down – 1 (→ 9th place)

Women's Competition
Women's Sprint
Tanya Dubnicoff
Qualifying – 11.494
1/8 Finals – defeated Kathrin Freitag of Germany
Quarterfinal – lost to Iryna Yanovych of Ukraine
Finals 5-8 – (→ 7th place)

Women's 500 m Time Trial
Tanya Dubnicoff
Final – 35.486 (→ 8th place)
Lori-Anne Muenzer
Final – 35.846 (→ 13th place)

Diving

Canada won two diving medals at the 2000 Sydney Olympics – one silver and one bronze. Anne Montminy won the first ever platform diving medal for Canada.

Men's 3 Metre Springboard
Jeff Liberty
 Preliminary – 375.06 (→  did not advance, 19th place)

Men's 10 Metre Platform
Alexandre Despatie
 Preliminary – 436.86
 Semi-final – 188.28 – 625.14
 Final – 464.07 – 652.35 (→ 4th place)

Men's 10 Metre Platform
Christopher Kalec
 Preliminary – 388.50
 Semi-final – 175.02 – 563.52 (→ did not advance, 17th place)

Women's 3 Metre Springboard
Eryn Bulmer
 Preliminary – 258.93 (→ did not advance, 20th place)

Women's 3 Metre Springboard
Blythe Hartley
 Preliminary – 295.98
 Semi-final – 219 – 514.98
 Final – 304.05 – 523.05 (→ 10th place)

Women's 10 Metre Platform
Anne Montminy
 Preliminary – 339.93
 Semi-final – 185.88 – 525.81
 Final – 354.27 – 540.15 (→  Bronze medal)

Women's 10 Metre Platform
Émilie Heymans
 Preliminary – 333.78
 Semi-final – 182.64 – 516.42
 Final – 329.28 – 511.92 (→ 5th place)

Women's Synchronized 3 Metre Springboard
Eryn Bulmer and Blythe Hartley
 Final – 279.00 (→ 5th place)

Women's Synchronized 10 Metre Platform
Émilie Heymans and Anne Montminy
 Final – 312.03 (→  Silver medal)

Equestrianism

Fencing

Four fencers, one man and three women, represented Canada in 2000.

Men's épée
 Laurie Shong

Women's foil
 Julie Mahoney
 Jujie Luan

Women's team foil
 Sherraine Schalm-MacKay, Julie Mahoney, Jujie Luan

Women's épée
 Sherraine Schalm-MacKay

Gymnastics

Artistic

Men
Individual finals

Women
Team

Individual finals

Trampoline

Field hockey

Men's Team Competition
Preliminary round (group A)
 Canada – Pakistan 2-2
 Canada – Germany 1–2
 Canada – Netherlands 2–5
 Canada – Great Britain 1-1
 Canada – Malaysia 1-1
Classification matches
 9th-12th place: Canada – Poland 3–2
 9th-10th place: Canada – Spain 0-3 (→ Tenth place)
Team roster
 Hari Kant (gk)
 Mike Mahood (gk)
 Ian Bird
 Alan Brahmst
 Robin D'Abreo
 Ronnie Jagday
 Ravi Kahlon
 Peter Milkovich (c)
 Bindi Kullar
 Rob Short
 Sean Campbell
 Chris Gifford
 Andrew Griffiths
 Ken Pereira
 Scott Mosher
 Paul Wettlaufer
Head Coach: Shiaz Virjee

Judo

Men

Women

Rowing

Sailing

Nine people competed for Canada in the sailing competition at the Olympics in six events.

Men's Single Handed Dinghy (Finn)
 Richard Clarke
 Race 1 – 14
 Race 2 – (20)
 Race 3 – 8
 Race 4 – 14
 Race 5 – 16
 Race 6 – 7
 Race 7 – 13
 Race 8 – 14
 Race 9 – 20
 Race 10 – 8
 Race 11 – (26) OCS
 Final – 114 (→ 17th place)

Men's Laser
Marty Essig
 Race 1 – 27
 Race 2 – 16
 Race 3 – 7
 Race 4 – (35)
 Race 5 – 25
 Race 6 – 13
 Race 7 – 23
 Race 8 – (44) OCS
 Race 9 – 26
 Race 10 – 18
 Race 11 – 21
 Final – 176 (→ 24th place)

Men's Two Handed Keelboat (Star)
Ross Macdonald and Kai Bjorn
 Race 1 – 7
 Race 2 – 5
 Race 3 – 13
 Race 4 – 4
 Race 5 – (14)
 Race 6 – 5
 Race 7 – 3
 Race 8 – (17) OCS
 Race 9 – 5
 Race 10 – 5
 Race 11 – 1
 Final – 48 (→ 5th place)

Men's Three Handed Keelboat (Soling)
Bill Abbott, Jr., Matt Abbott and Brad Boston
 13th place – did not advance to round robin round

Women's Mistral
Caroll-Ann Alie
 Race 1 – 15
 Race 2 – (21)
 Race 3 – 16
 Race 4 – (27)
 Race 5 – 12
 Race 6 – 17
 Race 7 – 18
 Race 8 – 20
 Race 9 – 11
 Race 10 – 15
 Race 11 – 15
 Final – 139 (→ 17th place)

Women's Single Handed Dinghy (Europe)
Beth Calkin
 Race 1 – 17
 Race 2 – 4
 Race 3 – (24)
 Race 4 – 18
 Race 5 – 3
 Race 6 – (25)
 Race 7 – 1
 Race 8 – 14
 Race 9 – 4
 Race 10 – 20
 Race 11 – 4
 Final – 85 (→ 11th place)

Shooting

Softball

Women's Team Competition
Preliminary round Robin
Lost to United States (0-6)
Lost to New Zealand (2-3)
Lost to Australia (0-1)
Defeated Italy (7-1)
Lost to Japan (3-4)
Lost to Cuba (1-2)
Lost to PR China (0-1) → 8th place
Team roster
Colleen Thorburn-Smith
Kristy Odamura
Jackie Lance
Cherene Hiesl-Boyer
Denise Carriere
Erin Woods
Heather Newsham
Jacki Nichol
Lesley Attwell
Nathalie Fradette
Sommer West
Vicky Bastarache
Hayley Wickenheiser
Meaggan Wilton
Sandy Newsham

Swimming

Men's 50 m Freestyle
Craig Hutchison
 Preliminary heat – DSQ (→ did not advance)

Men's 100 m Freestyle
Yannick Lupien
 Preliminary heat – 50.62 (→ did not advance)
Craig Hutchison
 Preliminary heat – 50.9 (→ did not advance)

Men's 200 m Freestyle
Rick Say
 Preliminary heat – 1:48.62
 Semi-final – 1:48.50
 Final – 1:48.76 (→ 7th place)
Mark Johnston
 Preliminary heat – 1:50.92 (→ did not advance)

Men's 400 m Freestyle
Rick Say
 Preliminary heat – 03:52.72 (did not advance)
Mark Johnston
 Preliminary heat – 03:54.99 (→ did not advance)

Men's 1500 m Freestyle
Andrew Hurd
 Preliminary heat – 15:30.98 (→ did not advance)
Tim Peterson
 Preliminary heat – 15:34.94 (→ did not advance)

Men's 100 m Butterfly
Mike Mintenko
 Preliminary heat – 52.9
 Semi-final – 53
 Final – 52.58 (→ 5th place)
Shamek Pietucha
 Preliminary heat – 54.14 (→ did not advance)

Men's 200 m Butterfly
Shamek Pietucha
 Preliminary heat – 01:59.59 (→ did not advance)

Men's 100 m Breaststroke
Morgan Knabe
 Preliminary heat – 01:01.81
 Semi-final – 01:01.70
 Final – 01:01.58 (→ 6th place)

Men's 200 m Breaststroke
Morgan Knabe
 Preliminary heat – 02:14.18
 Semi-final – 02:14.01 (→ did not advance)

Men's 100 m Backstroke
Chris Renaud
 Preliminary heat – 55.85
 Semi-final – 55.7 (→ did not advance)
Mark Versfeld
 Preliminary heat – 56.5 (→ did not advance)

Men's 200 m Backstroke
Chris Renaud
 Preliminary heat – 02:00.51
 Semi-final – 02:01.19 (→ did not advance)
Dustin Hersee
 Preliminary heat – 02:01.34 (→ did not advance)

Men's 200 m Individual Medley
Curtis Myden
 Preliminary heat – 02:21.78
 Semi-final – 02:01.99 (→ did not advance)
Brian Johns
 Preliminary heat – 02:03.12
 Semi-final – 02:02.92 (→ did not advance)

Men's 400 m Individual Medley
Curtis Myden
 Preliminary heat – 04:16.55
 Final – 04:15.33 →  Bronze medal
Owen von Richter
 Preliminary heat – 04:25.70 (→ did not advance)

Men's 4 × 100 m Freestyle Relay
Craig Hutchison, Robbie Taylor, Rick Say, and Yannick Lupien
 Preliminary heat – 03:21.98 (→ did not advance)

Men's 4 × 200 m Freestyle Relay
Mark Johnston, Brian Johns, Mike Mintenko, and Rick Say
 Preliminary heat – 07:21.45
Mark Johnston, Mike Mintenko, Rick Say, and Yannick Lupien
 Final – 07:21.92 (→ 7th place)

Men's 4 × 100 m Medley Relay
Chris Renaud, Morgan Knabe, Shamek Pietucha, and Yannick Lupien
 Preliminary heat – 03:40.56
Chris Renaud, Morgan Knabe, Mike Mintenko, and Craig Hutchison
 Final – 03:39.88 (→ 6th place)

Women's 50 m Freestyle
Nadine Rolland
 Preliminary heat – 26.04 (→ did not advance)
Jenna Gresdal
 Preliminary heat – 26.79 (→ did not advance)

Women's 100 m Freestyle
Laura Nicholls
 Preliminary heat – 56.3
 Semi-final – 55.94 (→ did not advance)
Marianne Limpert
 Preliminary heat – DNS (→ did not advance)

Women's 200 m Freestyle
Jessica Deglau
 Preliminary heat – 02:01.42 (→ did not advance)
Laura Nicholls
 Preliminary heat – 02:02.69 (→ did not advance)

Women's 400 m Freestyle
Karine Legault
 Preliminary heat – 04:15.55 (→ did not advance)

Women's 800 m Freestyle
Karine Legault
 Preliminary heat – 08:43.56 (→ did not advance)
Joanne Malar
 Preliminary heat – DNS (→ did not advance)

Women's 100 m Butterfly
Jen Button
 Preliminary heat – 01:00.83 (→ did not advance)
Jessica Deglau
 Preliminary heat – 01:00.97 (→ did not advance)

Women's 200 m Butterfly
Jen Button
 Preliminary heat – 02:11.74 (→ did not advance)
Jessica Deglau
 Preliminary heat – 02:12.86 (→ did not advance)

Women's 100 m Breaststroke
Christin Petelski
 Preliminary heat – 01:09.57
 Semi-final – 01:09.54 (→ did not advance)
Rhiannon Leier
 Preliminary heat – 01:09.68
 Semi-final – 01:09.63 (→ did not advance)

Women's 200 m Breaststroke
Christin Petelski
 Preliminary heat – 02:29.11
 Semi-final – 02:29.43 (→ did not advance)

Women's 100 m Backstroke
Kelly Stefanyshyn
 Preliminary heat – 01:02.78
 Semi-final – 01:02.35 (→ did not advance)
Michelle Lischinsky
 Preliminary heat – 01:02.89
 Semi-final – 01:02.55 (→ did not advance)

Women's 200 m Backstroke
Kelly Stefanyshyn
 Preliminary heat – 02:14.28
 Semi-final – 02:13.39
 Final – 2:14.57 (→ 8th place)

Women's 200 m Individual Medley
Joanne Malar
 Preliminary heat – 02:13.92
 Semi-final – 02:13.59
 Final – 02:13.70 (→ 5th place)

Women's 200 m Individual Medley
Marianne Limpert
 Preliminary heat – 02:15.07
 Semi-final – 02:13.90
 Final – 02:13.44 (→ 4th place)

Women's 400 m Individual Medley
Joanne Malar
 Preliminary heat – 04:42.65
 Final – 04:45.17 (→ 7th place)

Women's 4 × 100 m Freestyle Relay
Marianne Limpert, Shannon Shakespeare, Jessica Deglau, and Laura Nicholls
 Preliminary heat – 03:43.82
 Final – 03:42.92 (→ 7th place)

Women's 4 × 200 m Freestyle Relay
Jessica Deglau, Shannon Shakespeare, Katie Brambley, and Jen Button
 Preliminary heat – 08:07.12
Marianne Limpert, Shannon Shakespeare, Joanne Malar, and Jessica Deglau
 Final – 08:02.65 (→ 5th place)

Women's 4 × 100 m Medley Relay
Michelle Lischinsky, Christin Petelski, Jen Button, and Laura Nicholls
 Preliminary heat – 04:08.47
Kelly Stefanyshyn, Christin Petelski, Jen Button, and Marianne Limpert
 Final – 04:07.55 (→ 6th place)

Synchronized swimming

Table tennis

Taekwondo

Tennis

Triathlon

After ending the second phase of the triathlon in twenty-fourth place following a crash in the cycling portion of the event, Canada's only male triathlete at the first Olympic triathlon, Simon Whitfield, had by far the best run of any athlete present. He passed all twenty-three competitors that had been in front of him and finished over 13.5 seconds before the next triathlete to claim the gold medal. Canada's women did not fare so well, with two of them placing in the 30s and the third not finishing.

* Including Transition 1 (swimming-to-cycling) and T2 (cycling-to-running), roughly a minute.

Water polo

Women's team competition

Preliminary round Robin

 Classification match

Team roster
Marie-Luc Arpin
Isabelle Auger
Johanne Bégin
Cora Campbell
Melissa Collins
Marie-Claude Deslières
Valérie Dionne
Ann Dow
Susan Gardiner
Waneek Horn-Miller
Sandra Lizé
Josée Marsolais
Jana Salat

Weightlifting

Men

Wrestling

Freestyle

Death of Pierre Trudeau

Near the end of the Summer Olympics, on 28 September, Canadian athletes learned that former prime minister (from 1968 to 1984), Pierre Trudeau, had died. Owing to time difference, it was 29 September in Sydney.

Juan Antonio Samaranch, presiding over his last Olympics as IOC president, ordered the Canadian flag at athletes' village lowered to half-staff on orders from Canadian Foreign Affairs Minister Lloyd Axworthy. As the flag was lowered, Canadian athletes paid tribute to Trudeau During medal ceremonies, whenever the Canadian flag flew, it was flown at half-mast, also on orders from Samaranch and Axworthy. They both ordered the Canadian flag flown at half-staff for the remainder of the Olympics, as the state funeral didn't take place until 3 October.

Official outfitter

 Roots Canada was the official outfitter of clothing for members of the Canadian Olympic team. The same clothing was also sold at Roots stores in Canada.

Notes

Wallechinsky, David (2004). The Complete Book of the Summer Olympics (Athens 2004 Edition). Toronto, Canada. .
International Olympic Committee (2001). The Results. Retrieved 12 November 2005.
Sydney Organising Committee for the Olympic Games (2001). Official Report of the XXVII Olympiad Volume 1: Preparing for the Games. Retrieved 20 November 2005.
Sydney Organising Committee for the Olympic Games (2001). Official Report of the XXVII Olympiad Volume 2: Celebrating the Games. Retrieved 20 November 2005.
Sydney Organising Committee for the Olympic Games (2001). The Results. Retrieved 20 November 2005.
International Olympic Committee Web Site

References

Nations at the 2000 Summer Olympics
2000
Summer Olympics